Ryūjirō, Ryujiro, Ryuujirou or Ryuujiroh (written: 龍仁朗 or 隆二郎) is a masculine Japanese given name. Notable people with the name include:

, Japanese footballer
, Japanese footballer

Japanese masculine given names